Mahabo is a district of Menabe in Madagascar.

Communes
The district is further divided into 11 communes:

 Ambia
 Ampanihy
 Analamitsivala
 Ankilivalo
 Ankilizato
 Befotaka
 Beronono
 Mahabo
 Malaimbandy
 Mandabe
 Tsimazava

References 

Districts of Menabe